Old Post or similar, may refer to:

 Rural Municipality of Old Post No. 43, Saskatchewan, Canada
 Old Post Cemetery, Fort Huachuca, Arizona, USA
 Boston Post Road, New England, USA; also called "Old Post Road"
 Old Post Road, Central Park, New York City, New York State, USA
 Old Post Road, Northford Center Historic District, North Branford, Connecticut, USA

See also

 Musicians of the Old Post Road
 Old Post Office (disambiguation)
 
 Old Port (disambiguation)
 Post (disambiguation)
 Old (disambiguation)